The 1000 meters distance for men in the 2012–13 ISU Speed Skating World Cup was contested over nine races on six occasions, out of a total of nine World Cup occasions for the season, with the first occasion taking place in Heerenveen, Netherlands, on 16–18 November 2012, and the final occasion also taking place in Heerenveen on 8–10 March 2013.

Kjeld Nuis of the Netherlands won the cup, while the defending champion, Shani Davis of the United States, came second, and Hein Otterspeer of the Netherlands came third.

Top three

Race medallists

Standings 
Standings as of 10 March 2013 (end of the season).

References

Men 1000